Hywel Lloyd (born 14 March 1985 in Corwen, Wales) is a racing driver, currently driving in the British Formula 3 Championship for his family-run CF Racing team. Lloyd won the 2007 BARC Formula Renault Championship, before moving to the main championship.

References

External links
Driver DB Profile

Welsh racing drivers
1985 births
Living people
British Formula Renault 2.0 drivers
Formula Renault BARC drivers
British Formula Three Championship drivers
People from Corwen
Sportspeople from Denbighshire
Austrian Formula Three Championship drivers
Chris Dittmann Racing drivers
Manor Motorsport drivers